A Classic Christmas is the second Christmas album from American country music singer-songwriter Toby Keith. Released in 2007, the album comprises two discs. While his previous Christmas album, 1995's Christmas to Christmas, was composed of original songs, Keith recorded 20 Christmas standards for A Classic Christmas.

Critical reception

Stephen Thomas Erlewine of AllMusic writes "a holiday album of this size may seem like overkill, but this isn't one sprawling, unedited session: it's two distinct albums, the first containing secular seasonal standards, the second religious-themed carols." and finishes the review with "and both are solid holiday albums."

Andrew W. Griffin of reddirtreport.com writes in his review, "All in all, A Toby Keith Classic Christmas is the sort of holiday album all Oklahomans should add to their collection."

CMT reviewed the album and said, "Singing yuletide favorites in front of an intimate Nashville audience, superstar Toby Keith delivers a scaled down performance reminiscent of a family gathering with a visit from special guest, Jewel."

CBS News briefly touched on the album and mentioned "On The Early Show Friday, Keith agreed with the assessment of co-anchor Hannah Storm that the new CD is very traditional."

Track listing

Disc One

Disc Two

Personnel
 Lisa Cochran – background vocals
 Chad Cromwell – drums, percussion
 John Hobbs – keyboards
 Rob Ickes – dobro
 Toby Keith – acoustic guitar, lead vocals
 Dave Pomeroy – bass guitar
 Mica Roberts – background vocals
 John Wesley Ryles – background vocals
 Randy Scruggs – bouzouki, 12-string guitar, acoustic guitar
 Harry Stinson – background vocals
 Biff Watson – acoustic guitar
 Jonathan Yudkin – string bass, cello, celtic harp, octophone, viola, violin, xylophone

Charts

Weekly charts

Year-end charts

References

External links
Toby Keith: A Classic Christmas (Cut by Cut)

2007 Christmas albums
Christmas albums by American artists
Country Christmas albums
Toby Keith albums
Show Dog-Universal Music albums
Albums produced by Toby Keith